Postenje is a village in Serbia. It is situated in the Ljubovija municipality, in the Mačva District of Central Serbia. The village had a Serb ethnic majority and a population of 383 in 2002.

Historical population

1948: 1,061
1953: 818
1961: 598
1971: 707
1981: 590
1991: 493
2002: 383

References

See also
List of places in Serbia

Populated places in Mačva District
Ljubovija